Jaboticabal is a municipality in the state of São Paulo in Brazil. The population is 77,652 (2020 est.) in an area of 707 km². The town takes its name from the jabuticaba tree.

Jaboticabal is home to the UNESP university campus, and is also the city that produces the most peanuts in Brazil. Around the city are extensive sugar cane plantations and industries making Jaboticabal one of the most important cities in agrobusiness around its region.

Economy 

The municipality is located in one of the richest regions in São Paulo State, SE Brasil, responsible for approximately 8.5% of its gross domestic product (GDP).

References